The final of the Women's Javelin Throw event at the 2003 Pan American Games took place on Thursday August 7, 2003. America's Kim Kreiner dethroned reigning PanAm champion and world record holder Osleidys Menéndez from Cuba.

Medalists

Records

Results

See also
2003 World Championships in Athletics – Women's javelin throw
Athletics at the 2004 Summer Olympics – Women's javelin throw

References
Results

Javelin, Women
2003
2003 in women's athletics